The following is a list of bases of the Sri Lanka Air Force.

Air bases and academies
 SLAF China Bay (Sri Lanka Air Force Academy China Bay) – China Bay 
 SLAF Anuradhapura (Sri Lanka Air Force Base Anuradhapura) – Anuradhapura
 SLAF Hingurakgoda (Sri Lanka Air Force Base Hingurakgoda) – Hingurakgoda
 SLAF Katunayake (Sri Lanka Air Force Base Katunayake) – Katunayake
 SLAF Ratmalana (Sri Lanka Air Force Base Ratmalana) – Ratmalana
 SLAF Vavuniya (Sri Lanka Air Force Base Vavuniya) – Vavuniya

Stations
 SLAF Ampara (Sri Lanka Air Force Ampara) – Ampara
 SLAF Batticaloa (Sri Lanka Air Force Batticaloa) – Batticaloa
 SLAF Colombo (Sri Lanka Air Force Colombo) – Colombo – Air Force Headquarters
 SLAF Diyatalawa (Sri Lanka Air Force Diyatalawa) – Diyatalawa – Ground combat training center
 SLAF Ekala (Sri Lanka Air Force Trade Training School Ekala) – Ekala – Advanced & Specialized Trade Training School
 SLAF Iranamadu (Sri Lanka Air Force Station Iranamadu) – Iranamadu
 SLAF Katukurunda (Sri Lanka Air Force Katukurunda) – Katukurunda
 SLAF Koggala (Sri Lanka Air Force Koggala) – Koggala
 SLAF Mullaittivu (Sri Lanka Air Force Station Mullaittiv) – Mullaittivu
 SLAF Palaly (Sri Lanka Air Force Palaly) – Palaly
 SLAF Palavi (Sri Lanka Air Force Palavi) – Palavi
 SLAF Sigiriya (Sri Lanka Air Force Sigiriya) – Sigiriya
 SLAF Wirawila (Sri Lanka Air Force Wirawila) – Wirawila
 SLAF Mirigama (Sri Lanka Air Force Mirigama) – Mirigama – Radar station of the National Air Defence System
 SLAF Pidurutalagala (Sri Lanka Air Force Piduruthalagala) – summit of Mount Pidurutalagala – Radar station of the National Air Defence System

SLAF regiment deployment
 SLAF Mankulam – Mankulam
 SLAF Pankulam – Pankulam

Air bases (under development) 

 Nil.

Other
 SLAF BIA (Sri Lanka Air Force Bandaranayake International Airport) – Bandaranayake
 SLAF Morawewa (Sri Lanka Air Force Morawewa) – Morawewa
 SLAF Vanni (Air Force Combat Training School Vanni) – Vanni

See also
 Sri Lanka Air Force (SLAF)
 List of airports in Sri Lanka

References

Sources
 
 www.scramble.nl of Scramble Magazine

 
Sri
Sri Lanka Air Force
 
Air Force bases